MSN Music was a part of MSN's web services. It delivered music news, music videos, spotlights on new music, artist information, and live performances of artists. The website also served as a digital music store from 2004 to 2008.

History 
In 2004, Microsoft created an MSN Music download store to compete with Apple's iTunes Music Store, though its sales in comparison were negligible. The store utilized Microsoft's Windows Media Player application and proprietary Windows Media Format files (protected .wma files).

It started out with 1.5 million songs, but decreased to 1.1 million songs due to lagging sales and lack of real support from Microsoft.

The MSN Music store was not compatible with Microsoft's own Zune music player. As of 14 November 2006, MSN Music ceased music sales and now redirects viewers to either Zune or Real Rhapsody websites.

Microsoft acquired MongoMusic on September 13, 2000 and merged its technology.

In 2006, when announcing the closing of MSN Music in the United States, Microsoft promised users that license servers would be maintained for five years but in April 2008, Microsoft announced that the DRM servers for MSN Music would be deactivated on 2008-08-31.  After this date, it was no longer possible to reauthorize purchased songs when changing computers or operating systems.
They have suggested that customers back-up their music by burning it to CD. They later relented, and committed to keeping the DRM servers online through the end of 2011.

MSN's music section nonetheless remained online after 2008, hosting content such as music blogs and photo galleries; it continued to be referred to as MSN Music until folded into MSN's Entertainment section.

Other countries
Although MSN Music Downloads have ceased in the US, MSN Music Downloads (DRM Protected) are still available in the UK via the MSN UK Portal and/or through Windows Media Player although the service is powered by Nokia (formerly OD2).

References

External links
MSN Official website

MSN
Online music stores of the United States